Jørgen Heide (fl. 1542–1556) was a Danish composer.

See also
List of Danish composers

References
This article was initially translated from the Danish Wikipedia.

Danish composers
Male composers
Year of death unknown
Year of birth unknown